Red Devils is a 1923 Soviet adventure film directed by Ivan Perestiani based on the eponymous story by Pavel Blyakhin. It has become one of the most famous and oft-quoted works of the Soviet adventure film.

Plot
The film is about the adventures of three young agents, fighters of the 1st Cavalry Army, set against the background of the Russian Civil War and the struggle with the Makhnovist forces. At the beginning Nestor Makhno and his troops attack the village, committing various crimes, including murdering peasants, robbing huts, stealing livestock, killing communists. In the attack, a man's father is captured, tortured and killed under Makhno's orders. Afterwards, the three of them organize a detachment against Makhno.

Cast
Pavel Yesikovsky - Misha
Sofia Josephey - Dunyasha, Misha's sister
Kador Ben-Salim - Tom Jackson
Vladimir Kucherenko (credited as Vladimir Sutyrin) - Makhno
Konstantin Davidovsky - Budyonny
G. Lane - Petrov, worker, father of Misha and Dunyashi
Nikolay Nirov - Garbuzenko
Svetlana Lux - Oksana
Jan Burinsky - captain
Zakariy Berishvili - bandit
Georgiy Makarov - bandit
Patwakan Barkhudaryan - bandit

Sequels
 The Savur-Mohyla (1926)
 The Crime of Shirvanskaya (1926)
 The Punishment of Shirvanskaya (1926)
 Ilan-dili (1926)

See also
 Red Devils (story)

External links

References

Soviet silent feature films
Films directed by Ivan Perestiani
Odesa Film Studio films
Soviet black-and-white films
Soviet adventure films
1923 adventure films
1923 films
Cultural depictions of Nestor Makhno
Silent adventure films
Soviet-era films from Georgia (country)
1920s Russian-language films